INS Ranjit is the third of the five  built for the Indian Navy. Ranjit was commissioned on 15 September 1983 and remained in service till 6 May 2019, when it was decommissioned.

Construction and service 
Ranjit was laid down by Indian request under the Soviet name Lovkiy at the 61 Kommunara Shipbuilding Plant in Nikolayev, Ukraine on 29 June 1977 with the serial number 2203. She had previously been planned to be named Porazhayushchy on 16 May of that year, and was built as a Project 61MZ large anti-submarine ship (NATO reporting name Kashin-class destroyer). The destroyer was launched on 16 June 1979 and added to the list of ships of the Soviet Navy on 30 October 1981. 

She was commissioned on 15 September 1983 in the erstwhile USSR with then Captain Vishnu Bhagwat in command. She completed post commissioning trials and set sail from Poti in USSR on 14 November 1983 and entered Mumbai on 22 Dec 1983. She visited ports in Bulgaria, Yugoslavia and Egypt during her maiden voyage to India. She joined the Western Fleet and operated under the Flag of FOCWF till April 1999. In May 1999, she changed her home port to Vishakhapatnam to become a part of the Eastern Fleet.

INS Ranjit  was decommissioned at the naval dockyard in Visakhapatnam on 6 May 2019 after serving for 36 years. Her last commanding officer was Captain Vikram C Mehra.

During TROPEX-21 exercise of the Indian Navy, the decommissioned Ranjit was sunk by a torpedo.

References

Bibliography

External links
 Rajput class at Bharat-Rakshak.com

Rajput-class destroyers
Ships built in the Soviet Union
1979 ships
Destroyers of the Cold War